Mauritius competed in their eleventh Commonwealth Games in 2002 sending both male and female athletes to compete in Athletics, Badminton, Boxing, Judo, Swimming, Table Tennis and Weightlifting
The nation gained their only medal in 100 kg men's judo, a bronze. This was a decrease on Kuala Lumpur 1998 when it won a gold a silver and two bronze.

Bronze
Judo:
 Antonio Felicite Men's Judo - 100 kg class

See also
2002 Commonwealth Games results

References

2002
Com
Nations at the 2002 Commonwealth Games